Roman Records was a Canadian record label that existed in Toronto, Ontario during the mid-to-late 1960s.  It was founded by local radio disc jockey Duff Roman and his brother Danny Mostoway as a vehicle to record and release music by local artists, including David Clayton-Thomas and The Shays, Little Caesar and the Consuls, The Paupers, and Levon and the Hawks.  After a few years, Duff Roman renewed his focus on a radio career and Roman Records stopped visible activities.

References

External links 
 Listing of releases at Discogs.com

Canadian independent record labels
Record labels established in 1965 
Record labels disestablished in 1969 
Rock record labels
1960s establishments in Ontario 
1960s disestablishments in Ontario